Several species of fish are claimed to produce hallucinogenic effects when consumed.  For example, Sarpa salpa, a species of sea bream, is commonly claimed to be hallucinogenic. These widely distributed coastal fish are normally found in the Mediterranean and around Spain, and along the west and south coasts of Africa. Occasionally they are found in British waters. They may induce hallucinogenic effects similar to LSD if eaten. However, based on the reports of exposure they are more likely to resemble hallucinogenic effects of deliriants than the effects of serotonergic psychedelics such as LSD. In 2006, two men who apparently ate the fish experienced hallucinations lasting for several days (an effect common with some naturally occurring deliriants). The likelihood of hallucinations depends on the season. Sarpa salpa is known as "the fish that makes dreams" in Arabic.

Other species claimed to be capable of producing hallucinations include several species of sea chub from the genus Kyphosus. It is unclear whether the toxins are produced by the fish themselves or by marine algae in their diet. Other hallucinogenic fish are Siganus spinus, called "the fish that inebriates" in Reunion Island, and Mulloidichthys flavolineatus (formerly Mulloidichthys samoensis), called "the chief of ghosts" in Hawaii.

Cause of hallucinations

The active agent(s) that cause hallucinations in humans, and the origin of these agents, are not clear. Some authors think they could come from toxins associated with macroalgae that accumulate in the flesh of the fish. Toxins from the green algae Caulerpa prolifera in the Mediterranean Sea appear to be implicated, as is the seagrass Posidonia oceanica. When herbivores eat seagrass leaves they ingest algal epiphytes and toxic dinoflagellates that live on the seagrass leaves. The German anthropologist Christian Rätsch thinks that dreamfish might contain the hallucinogen DMT.

Hallucinogenic species

Ichthyoallyeinotoxism

Ichthyoallyeinotoxism, or hallucinogenic fish inebriation, is a clinical syndrome that refers to a hallucinogenic inebriation of a distressing nature that can arise from consuming hallucinogenic fish. It is characterised by "psychologic disturbances of hallucination and depression. Gastrointestinal disturbance may occur". "Ichthyoallyeinotoxism is a kind of ichthysarcotoxism (fish flesh poisoning) responsible of an unusual clinical feature: it is the unique case of central nervous system ichthyotoxicity. The most frequent signs are dizziness, loss of co-ordination and hallucinations."

Ichthyoallyeinotoxism may result from eating the flesh or the head of the fish where the poison is reputedly concentrated. This biotoxication is sporadic and unpredictable in its occurrence. The poison affects primarily the central nervous system. The symptoms may develop within a few minutes to 2 hours and persist for 24 hours or longer. Symptoms are dizziness, loss of equilibrium, lack of motor coordination, hallucinations and mental depression. A common complaint of the victim is that "someone is sitting on my chest", or there is a sensation of a tight construction around the chest. The conviction that he is going to die, or some other frightening phantasy, is a characteristic part of the clinical picture. Other complaints consist of itching, burning of the throat, muscular weakness and abdominal distress. No fatalities have been reported, and in comparison with other forms of ichthyosarcotoxism, hallucinogenic fish poisoning is relatively mild... Ordinary cooking procedures do not destroy the poison.

Psychedelic fish

Hallucinogenic fish can be contrasted with psychedelic fish. Fish that look like psychedelic paintings are often referred to as psychedelic fish, while fish that can give you hallucinations if you eat them are often called hallucinogenic fish. Psychedelic fish do not generally produce hallucinations if eaten, but look as if they were the product of a psychedelic hallucination. Hallucinogenic fish do not generally look like psychedelic fish, but can produce hallucinations if eaten.

See also
 5-Bromo-DMT
 Entheogen
 Hallucinogenic plant
 Serotonergic psychedelic
 Venomous fish

References

External links
 Dolphins 'getting high' on puffer fish, zoologist Rob Pilley says  news.com.au, 30 December 2013.

Biological sources of psychoactive drugs
Toxic effect of noxious substances eaten as food
Hallucinations